Kiaeria may refer to:
Kiaeria (plant), a genus of plants of the family Dicranaceae
Kiaeria limuloides, an extinct monotypic genus of chasmataspidid

See also
Kiaeritia, a genus of ostracod formerly known as Kiaeria